The Guépard II XJ01 is a Belgian autogyro that was designed by Joel Tilquin and produced by Guépard II Team of Boncelles, first flown on 28 May 2009 at the Bois-de-la-Pierre fly-in. Now out of production, when it was available the aircraft was supplied as a kit for amateur construction.

Design and development
The XJ01 is a development of the Guépard AX 02 that was designed by Xavier Averso in the 1980s and first offered as plans in 1987. Tilquin decided not to publish plans and instead offer the updated version as a kit, starting in 2011. The kit provided by Guépard II Team included the fuselage frame but did not include the rotor system, propeller, engine or instruments.

The company seems to have gone out of business at the end of 2015 and kit production ended.

The design features a single main rotor, a single-seat open cockpit without a windshield, tricycle landing gear without wheel pants and a twin-cylinder, liquid-cooled, two-stroke, dual-ignition  Rotax 582 engine in pusher configuration.

The aircraft fuselage is made from bolted-together aluminum tubing.

Specifications (XJ01)

See also
List of rotorcraft

References

External links
Official website archives on Archive.org

XJ01
2000s Belgian sport aircraft
Homebuilt aircraft
Single-engined pusher autogyros
Aircraft first flown in 2009